Oreonetides is a genus of dwarf spiders that was first described by Embrik Strand in 1901.

Species
 it contains seventeen species:
Oreonetides badzhalensis Eskov, 1991 – Russia (Far East)
Oreonetides beattyi Paquin, Dupérré, Buckle & Lewis, 2009 – USA
Oreonetides beringianus Eskov, 1991 – Russia (E-Siberia, Far East)
Oreonetides filicatus (Crosby, 1937) – Canada, USA
Oreonetides flavescens (Crosby, 1937) – USA, Canada
Oreonetides flavus (Emerton, 1915) – USA, Canada
Oreonetides glacialis (L. Koch, 1872) – Europe
Oreonetides helsdingeni Eskov, 1984 – Russia
Oreonetides kolymensis Eskov, 1991 – Russia
Oreonetides minimus Tanasevitch, 2017 – Russia (Far East)
Oreonetides quadridentatus (Wunderlich, 1972) – Belgium, Germany, Austria
Oreonetides rectangulatus (Emerton, 1913) – USA
Oreonetides rotundus (Emerton, 1913) – USA, Canada
Oreonetides sajanensis Eskov, 1991 – Russia
Oreonetides shimizui (Yaginuma, 1972) – Russia, Japan
Oreonetides taiwanus Tanasevitch, 2011 – Taiwan
Oreonetides vaginatus (Thorell, 1872) (type) – North America, Europe, Russia (European to Far East), Japan

See also
 List of Linyphiidae species (I–P)

References

Araneomorphae genera
Linyphiidae
Spiders of Asia
Spiders of North America
Taxa named by Embrik Strand